Frisilia cornualis is a moth in the family Lecithoceridae. It is found in Taiwan and Vietnam.

The wingspan is 11–12 mm. The forewings are greyish orange with dark scales scattered irregularly on the upper surface. There is a small discal spot at the middle, a reniform (kidney shaped) stigma beyond the cell and dark-brown scales along the costa at the basal one-fourth. The hindwings are grey.

Etymology
The species name refers to the horn shaped cornuti in the aedeagus and is derived from Latin cornu (meaning horn).

References

Moths described in 2008
Frisilia